Otjozondjupa is one of the fourteen regions of Namibia. Its capital is Otjiwarongo. The region further contains the municipalities of Okahandja and Grootfontein and the towns Okakarara and Otavi. , Otjozondjupa had 97,945 registered voters.

Geography
A landmark within this region is the Waterberg Plateau Park. Twenty four kilometres west of Grootfontein lies the huge Hoba meteorite.  At over 60 tons, it is the largest known meteorite on Earth, as well as being the largest naturally occurring mass of iron known to exist on the planet's surface.

In the east, Otjozondjupa borders the North-West District of Botswana.  Domestically, it borders more regions than any other region of Namibia:
Omaheke – southeast
Khomas – south
Erongo – southwest
Kunene – northwest
Oshikoto – north
Kavango – northeast

Economy and infrastructure

Otjiwarongo, Grootfontein, Otavi, and Okahandja are linked by rail and by the main B1 and B8 trunk roads running from south to north. Communication systems in these areas are also of a high standard.

The farming activities of Okahandja and Otjiwarongo are homogeneous as these parts are well known for cattle farming. The Otavi and Grootfontein districts, and to a lesser extent also Otjiwarongo, are the granary of Namibia. The region also has a great potential to establish industries connected with such farming activities and by-products of it. It further has the advantage of combining communal and commercial farming in the same region.

According to the 2012 Namibia Labour Force Survey, unemployment in the region is 25.3%. Otjozondjupa has 72 schools with a total of 36,284 pupils.

Politics
The region comprises seven constituencies:
 Grootfontein
 Okahandja
 Okakarara
 Omatako
 Otavi
 Otjiwarongo
 Tsumkwe

Regional elections
The 2015 regional elections saw SWAPO obtain 58.4% of the votes cast (2010: 48.9%) and win five of the seven constituencies. The National Unity Democratic Organisation (NUDO) won two, Okakarara and Omatako. The same two constituencies went to NUDO again in the 2020 regional election. SWAPO's support dropped to 44.3%, but it won the other five constituencies again. NUDO overall obtained 14.1% of the popular vote in this election. The upstart Independent Patriots for Change (IPC), an opposition party formed in August 2020, obtained 12.9% overall, and the Popular Democratic Movement (PDM) got 11.9%, but both did not get close to winning any single constituency.

Governors
 Rapama Kamehozu (2011–2012)
 Otto Ipinge (2015–2020)
 James Uerikua (2020–present)

References

External links
 Official website Otjozondjupa Regional Council

 
Regions of Namibia